Cerić may refer to:

 Cerić, Croatia, a village near Vinkovci
 Cerić (surname), a Bosnian surname